David Quinlan (born 1978) is an Irish rugby union player. He plays as a number 8 for Shannon RFC, where he has been captain since 2005. In the past he has also played for Buccaneers RFC.

References

Irish rugby union players
Shannon RFC players
Buccaneers RFC players
Living people
1978 births
Place of birth missing (living people)